Balázs Tornay (born 31 May 1969) is a Hungarian alpine skier. He competed in three events at the 1992 Winter Olympics.

References

1969 births
Living people
Hungarian male alpine skiers
Olympic alpine skiers of Hungary
Alpine skiers at the 1992 Winter Olympics
Skiers from Budapest
20th-century Hungarian people